Alessio Alessandro (born 29 April 1996) is a Belgian professional footballer who plays as a midfielder for Verbroedering Geel, on loan from Patro Eisden Maasmechelen.

Club career
Born in Genk, Alessandro kicked off his career with local club Genk  in 2014. He was immediately loaned out to Eerste Divisie club MVV Maastricht along with a host of other teammates. He made his debut against Almere City where he was substituted off in the 58th minute.

On 23 October 2019, Alessandro joined K. Patro Eisden Maasmechelen.

References

External links
 
 MVV profile
 

1996 births
Living people
Belgian footballers
Belgian expatriate footballers
K.R.C. Genk players
MVV Maastricht players
K.V.C. Westerlo players
K. Patro Eisden Maasmechelen players
Eerste Divisie players
Challenger Pro League players
Belgian Third Division players
Association football midfielders
Sportspeople from Genk
Footballers from Limburg (Belgium)
Belgium youth international footballers
Belgian expatriate sportspeople in the Netherlands
Expatriate footballers in the Netherlands
AS Verbroedering Geel players